Gerard Barrett is an Irish filmmaker. He came to prominence when he won the Rising Star Award at the 10th Irish Film & Television Awards for his debut, Pilgrim Hill. His follow-up Glassland starred Jack Reynor as a young man who tries to help his mother (Toni Collette).

In 2015, Barrett filmed Brain on Fire based on the book of the same name, starring Chloë Grace Moretz in New York City and Canada.

His television mini-series Smalltown was screened in Ireland in September 2016. In 2017, his movie, Limbo premiered at the 29th Galway Film Fleadh, and his hour-long drama, Honey, was sold to FX.

Barrett attended St Michael's College, Listowel. A graduate of Tralee IT, where he studied Film, TV and Media. He was married on 2 January 2016.

Filmography 

 The Valley of Knockanure (2009)
 Pilgrim Hill (2013)
 Glassland (2014)
 Brain on Fire (2015)

Television 

 Smalltown (2016)
 Limbo (2017)

Awards 

 10th Irish Film & Television Awards - Winner: Rising Star Award, for Pilgrim Hill (2013)
 International Festival of Independent Cinema Off Camera - Winner: Making Way Award, for Glassland (2014)

References

1987 births
Living people
Irish film directors
People educated at St Michael's College, Listowel
Alumni of Institute of Technology, Tralee
People from Listowel